Robert Tang Kwok-ching, GBM, SBS, JP (born 7 January 1947) is a retired Hong Kong judge.  He previously served as a permanent judge of the Court of Final Appeal, and before that, the vice-president of the Court of Appeal in Hong Kong. Following his retirement, he was appointed a non-permanent judge of the Court of Final Appeal.

Early life and education
Born in Shanghai, Robert Tang received his education in England. In 1969, he graduated from the University of Birmingham.

Legal career
Tang began his legal career as a barrister at Gray's Inn in England in 1969. He was called to the Bar in Hong Kong in 1970, the Bar of Victoria, Australia in 1984, and the New York Bar in 1986.  Tang was appointed as Queen's Counsel in 1986. In 1992, he was admitted as a barrister in Singapore.  From 1988 to 1990 he was Chairman of the Hong Kong Bar Association.  During his time in private practice, he was eminently successful and was described by his former pupil and current Chief Justice Geoffrey Ma to have had arguably "the most successful practice” in the profession.

Judicial career
Tang served as a Deputy District Judge in 1982 and as a Deputy High Court Judge in 1986.  He was appointed as a Recorder of the High Court in 1995 and appointed a judge of the High Court in April 2004.

He became a Justice of Appeal of the Court of Appeal of Hong Kong on 3 January 2005 and was later appointed as the Vice-President of the Court of Appeal of Hong Kong on 1 November 2006.

He was appointed a non-permanent judge of the Court of Final Appeal on 1 September 2010. He then became a permanent judge of the Court on 25 October 2012.

From October 2012 to September 2018, Tang was a member of the Law Reform Commission of Hong Kong.

On 21 March 2018, the judiciary announced that Tang would be appointed as a non-permanent judge following his retirement; Andrew Cheung was named as his successor in the Court of Final Appeal.

Family
Tang is married to Cissy K. S. Lam and has two children, Hilary and Charles Tang.

Honours
In 2004, Tang was awarded the Silver Bauhinia Star for his judicial service in Hong Kong.

References

External links 
 Robert C. Tang's personal website

Hong Kong judges
Living people
1947 births
Alumni of the University of Birmingham
British Hong Kong judges